Eoophyla idiotis is a moth in the family Crambidae. It was described by Edward Meyrick in 1894. It is found on Sulawesi.

References

Eoophyla
Moths described in 1894